Sunbury County was a county in Nova Scotia.  The county ceased to exist when the province of New Brunswick was created in 1784. 

The county was created in 1765, alongside a formal enlargement of Cumberland County north and westward (taking in present-day Westmoreland and Albert Counties, New Brunswick). Sunbury County's seat and its court of general sessions were established at Campobello Island, in Passamaquoddy Bay. 

Campobello was fairly central on the coast under its purview, as Sunbury included what the Province of Massachusetts regarded as the eastern portion of its district of Maine. (In practice, neither Boston nor Halifax were interested in expending energy or money to administer the area so the geographic overlap was permitted to exist.) 

In 1784, in part due to the immigration to Nova Scotia of many thousands of Loyalists refugees, Sunbury County, with the newer, mainland portion of Cumberland, became the Colony of New Brunswick. British recognition of U.S. Independence had necessitated the turnover of the western third of Sunbury to the District of Maine, then still part of Massachusetts. 

After much redefinition and reduction in subsequent decades, there remains in central New Brunswick a county holding the name Sunbury.

References

External links
Photographs of Historic Monuments, Sunbury County, Nova Scotia

Sunbury County
History of Nova Scotia by location
1765 establishments in Nova Scotia
1784 disestablishments in Nova Scotia